Cerro Steffen is one of the highest mountains in the Southern Patagonian Ice Field. It lies on the northeastern edge of the just mentioned icefield, west of O'Higgins Lake.

References

Three-thousanders of the Andes
Mountains of Aysén Region